Abraham Karem (born 1937) is a designer of fixed and rotary-wing unmanned aircraft. He is regarded as the founding father of UAV (drone) technology.

Biography
Abraham Karem was born in Baghdad, Iraq, to an Assyrian Jewish couple. His family moved to Israel in 1951, where he grew up. From an early age, he had an innate passion for aeronautics, and at the age of 14, he started building model aircraft. Karem is regarded as the founding father of UAV (drone) technology. He graduated as an aeronautical engineer from the Technion. He built his first drone during the Yom Kippur War for the Israeli Air Force. In the 1970s, he immigrated to the United States.

Engineering career
He founded Leading Systems Inc. in his home garage, where he started manufacturing his first drone, Albatross, and later on, the more sophisticated Amber, which eventually evolved into the famous General Atomics MQ-1 Predator drone, which brought him the title of "Drone father".

Karem has been described by The Economist magazine as the man who "created the robotic plane that transformed the way modern warfare is waged and continues to pioneer other airborne innovations". Leading Systems has since gone bankrupt and was bought up by the US defense contractor General Atomics, which employed Karem and his team for the development of ultra-high endurance UAVs. The new development resulted in the creation of the Predator, based on the previous model Amber.

Awards and recognition
In 2010, Karem was elected a member of the National Academy of Engineering for the development of long-endurance unmanned aerial vehicles and variable rotor speed VTOL aircraft systems.

References

American aerospace engineers
American people of Iraqi-Jewish descent
Israeli aerospace engineers
Living people
People from Baghdad
1937 births